Dan Sinker is an American author, publisher, and entrepreneur. He currently serves as the inaugural fellow of the Center for Journalism Integrity & Excellence (CJIE), is co-host of the Says Who? podcast, and speaks on the state of journalism, the rise of fake news, and how to fix it.

Early life and education 
Sinker was born in London, raised in Evanston, Illinois and attended Evanston Township High School.

Career 
In 1994, at the age of 19, Sinker founded Punk Planet, an independent music, politics and culture magazine that helped to document the independent music and art scenes of the 1990s and 2000s.

From 2004 to 2011, Sinker was an assistant professor in the Journalism Department at Columbia College. In 2008, Sinker was a John S. Knight Journalism Fellowships at Stanford.

In 2010 and 2011, Sinker was the author of the @MayorEmanuel Twitter account. a parody account that Atlantic Magazine said, "pushed the boundaries of the medium, making Twitter feel less like a humble platform for updating your status and more like a place where literature could happen."

In 2011, he led the Knight-Mozilla News Technology Partnership of the Mozilla Foundation, which was spun out as Open News in 2017.

Since 2018, he has been an independent author, consultant, and entrepreneur, writing for Esquire Magazine, and creating products like the Pee Tape and Robert Mueller III Prayer Candles.

Books 
Sinker is the author of and contributor to a number of books.

 We Owe You Nothing, Punk Planet: The Collected Interviews, 2001
 We Owe You Nothing: Expanded Edition: Punk Planet: The Collected Interviews (Punk Planet Books), 2007
 The F***ing Epic Twitter Quest of @MayorEmanuel, Scribner, 2011
 How I Resist (contributor), 2018
 Arte Agora: Art made, sold, or placed in the public way (foreword)

References

American male journalists
Living people
Year of birth missing (living people)